The Goat is a 1917 American silent comedy film featuring Oliver Hardy. Like many American films of the time, The Goat was subject to cuts by city and state film censorship boards. The Chicago Board of Censors cut, in reel 2, the man raising the girl's leg to strike a match on her shoe, all scenes of Billy West in the wrong bed, and the holding of hands across twin beds.

Cast
 Billy West as An Inventor
 Oliver Hardy as His Neighbor (credited as Babe Hardy)
 Bud Ross
 Leo White
 Florence McLaughlin
 Polly Bailey
 Joe Cohen
 Ethelyn Gibson
 Agnes Neilson

See also
 Oliver Hardy filmography

References

External links

1917 films
1917 comedy films
1917 short films
American silent short films
Silent American comedy films
American black-and-white films
Censored films
Films directed by Arvid E. Gillstrom
American comedy short films
1910s American films